Kazuharu (written: 和春, 和晴 or 一治) is a masculine Japanese given name. Notable people with the name include:

, Japanese sport wrestler
, Japanese sumo wrestler
, Japanese shogi player
, Japanese professional wrestler

Japanese masculine given names